LGBT themes in speculative fiction include lesbian, gay, bisexual, or transgender (LGBT) themes in science fiction, fantasy, horror fiction and related genres. Such elements may include an LGBT character as the protagonist or a major character, or explorations of sexuality or gender that deviate from the heteronormative.

Science fiction and fantasy have traditionally been puritanical genres aimed at a male readership, and can be more restricted than non-genre literature by their conventions of characterisation and the effect that these conventions have on depictions of sexuality and gender. However, speculative fiction also gives authors and readers the freedom to imagine societies that are different from real-life cultures. This freedom makes speculative fiction a useful means of examining sexual bias, by forcing the reader to reconsider their heteronormative cultural assumptions. It has also been claimed by critics such as Nicola Griffith that LGBT readers identify strongly with the mutants, aliens, and other outsider characters found in speculative fiction.

History
Before the 1960s, explicit sexuality of any kind was rare in speculative fiction, as the editors who controlled what was published attempted to protect their perceived key market of adolescent male readers. As the readership broadened, it became possible to include characters who were undisguised homosexuals, though these tended to be villains, and lesbians remained almost entirely unrepresented. In the 1960s, science fiction and fantasy began to reflect the changes prompted by the civil rights movement and the emergence of a counterculture. New wave and feminist science fiction authors realised cultures in which homosexuality, bisexuality and a variety of gender models were the norm, and in which sympathetic depictions of alternative sexuality were commonplace.

From the 1980s onwards, homosexuality gained much wider mainstream acceptance and was often incorporated into otherwise conventional speculative fiction stories. Works emerged that went beyond simple representation of homosexuality to explorations of specific issues relevant to the LGBT community. This development was helped by the growing number of openly gay or lesbian authors and their early acceptance by speculative fiction fandom. Specialist gay publishing presses and a number of awards recognising LGBT achievements in the genre emerged, and by the twenty-first century, blatant homophobia was no longer considered acceptable by most readers of speculative fiction.

There was a concurrent increase in representation of homosexuality within non-literary forms of speculative fiction. The inclusion of LGBT themes in comic books, television and film continues to attract media attention and controversy, while the perceived lack of sufficient representation, along with unrealistic depictions, provokes criticism from LGBT sources.

Critical analysis

As genres of popular literature, science fiction (SF) and fantasy often seem more constrained than non-genre literature by their conventions of characterisation and the effects that these conventions have on depictions of sexuality and gender. Science fiction in particular has traditionally been a puritanical genre oriented toward a male readership. Sex is often linked to disgust in SF and horror, and plots based on sexual relationships have mainly been avoided in genre fantasy narratives. On the other hand, science fiction and fantasy can also provide more freedom than realistic literature to imagine alternatives to the default assumptions of heterosexuality and masculinity that permeate many cultures. Homosexuality is now an accepted and common feature of science fiction and fantasy literature, its prevalence due to the influence of lesbian-feminist and gay liberation movements.

In speculative fiction, extrapolation allows writers to focus not on the way things are (or were), as non-genre literature does, but on the way things could be different. It provides science fiction with a quality that science fiction critic Darko Suvin has called "cognitive estrangement": the recognition that what we are reading is not the world as we know it, but a world whose differences force us to reconsider our own with an outsider's perspective. When the extrapolation involves sexuality or gender, it can force the reader to reconsider their heteronormative cultural assumptions; the freedom to imagine societies different from real-life cultures makes SF an effective tool for examining sexual bias. In science fiction, such estranging features include technologies that significantly alter sex or reproduction. In fantasy, such features include figures such as mythological deities and heroic archetypes, who are not limited by preconceptions of human sexuality and gender, allowing them to be reinterpreted. SF has also depicted a plethora of alien methods of reproduction and sex, some of which can be viewed as homo- or bisexual through a human binary-gender lens.

In spite of the freedom offered by the genres, gay characters often remain contrived and stereotypical, and most SF stories take for granted the continuation of heteronormative institutions. Alternative sexualities have usually been approached allegorically, or by including LGBT characters in such a way as to not contradict mainstream society's assumptions about gender roles. Works that feature gay characters are more likely to be written by women writers, and to be viewed as being aimed at other women or girls; big-name male writers are less likely to explore gay themes.

Speculative fiction has traditionally been "straight"; Samuel R. Delany has written that the science fiction community is predominantly made up of white male heterosexuals, but that the proportion of minorities, including gay people, is generally higher than found in a "literary" group. The inclusion of homosexuality in SF has been described in Science Fiction Culture as "sometimes lagging behind the general population, sometimes surging ahead". Nicola Griffith has written that LGBT readers tend to identify strongly with the outsider status of mutants, aliens, and characters who lead hidden or double lives in science fiction. In comparison, Geoff Ryman has claimed that the gay and SF genre markets are incompatible, with his books being marketed as one or the other, but never both, and David Seed said that SF purists have denied that SF that focuses on soft science fiction themes and marginalised groups (including "gay SF") is "real" science fiction. Gay and lesbian science fiction have at times been grouped as distinct subgenres of SF, and have some tradition of separate publishers and awards.

Literature

Proto-SF

A True History by the Greek writer Lucian (A.D. 120–185) has been called the earliest surviving example of science fiction and the first ever "gay science fiction story". The narrator is suddenly enveloped by a typhoon and swept up to the moon, which is inhabited by a society of men that are at war with the sun. After the hero distinguishes himself in combat, the king gives him his son the prince in marriage. The all-male society reproduces (male children only) by giving birth from the thigh or by growing a child from a plant produced by planting the left testicle in the moon's soil.

In other proto-SF works, sex itself, of any type, was equated with base desires or "beastliness", as in Gulliver's Travels, which contrasts the animalistic and overtly sexual Yahoos with the reserved and intelligent Houyhnhnms. The frank treatment of sexual topics of pre-nineteenth century literature was abandoned in most speculative fiction, although Wendy Pearson has written that issues of gender and sexuality have been central to SF since its inception but were ignored by readers and critics until the late twentieth century. Early works that contained LGBT themes and showed the gay characters to be morally impure include the first lesbian vampire story Carmilla (1872) by Sheridan Le Fanu and The Picture of Dorian Gray (1890) by Oscar Wilde, which shocked contemporary readers with its sensuality and overtly homosexual characters.

An Anglo-American Alliance, a 1906 novel by Gregory Casparian, was the first SF-themed novel to openly portray a lesbian romantic relationship.

Pulp era (1920–30s)
During the pulp era, explicit sexuality of any kind was rare in genre science fiction and fantasy. For many years, the editors who controlled what was published felt that they had to protect the adolescent male readership that they identified as their principal market. Although the covers of some 1930s pulp magazines showed scantily clad women menaced by tentacled aliens, the covers were often more lurid than the magazines' contents. In such a context, writers like Edgar Pangborn, who featured passionate male friendships in his work, were exceptional; almost until the end of their careers, including so much as a kiss would have been too much. Implied or disguised sexuality was as important as that which was openly revealed. As such, genre SF reflected the social mores of the day, paralleling common prejudices; this was particularly true of pulp fiction, more so than literary works of the time.

As the demographics of the readership broadened, it became possible to include characters who were more or less undisguised homosexuals, but these, in accordance with the attitudes of the times, tended to be villains: evil, demented, or effeminate stereotypes. The most popular role for the homosexual was as a 'decadent slaveholding lordling' whose corrupt tyranny was doomed to be overthrown by the young male heterosexual hero. During this period, lesbians were almost entirely unrepresented as either heroes or villains.

One of the earliest examples of genre science fiction that involves a challenging amount of unconventional sexual activity is the early novel Odd John (1935), by Olaf Stapledon. John is a mutant with extraordinary mental abilities who will not allow himself to be bound by many of the rules imposed by the ordinary British society of his time. The novel strongly implies that he seduces an older boy who becomes devoted to him but also suffers from the affront that the relationship creates to his own morals.

Golden Age (1940–50s)
In the Golden Age of Science Fiction, the genre "resolutely ignored the whole subject" of homosexuality, according to Joanna Russ. As the readership for science fiction and fantasy began to age in the 1950s, however, writers like Philip Jose Farmer and Theodore Sturgeon were able to introduce more explicit sexuality into their work. Until the late 1960s, however, few other writers depicted alternative sexuality or revised gender roles, or openly investigated sexual questions. The majority of LGBT characters were depicted as caricatures, such as "man-hating amazons", and attempts at portraying homosexuals sympathetically or non-stereotypically were met with hostility.

Sturgeon wrote many stories during the Golden Age of Science Fiction that emphasised the importance of love, regardless of the current social norms. In his short story "The World Well Lost" (1953), first published in Universe magazine, homosexual alien fugitives and unrequited (and taboo) human homosexual love are portrayed. The tagline for the Universe cover was "[His] most daring story"; its sensitive treatment of homosexuality was unusual for science fiction published at that time, and it is now regarded as a milestone in science fiction's portrayal of homosexuality.  According to an anecdote related by Samuel R. Delany, when Sturgeon first submitted the story, the editor (Haywood Braun) not only rejected it but phoned every other editor he knew and urged them to reject it as well. Sturgeon would later write Affair with a Green Monkey, which examined social stereotyping of homosexuals, and in 1960 published Venus Plus X, in which a single-gender society is depicted and the protagonist's homophobia portrayed unfavourably.

Images of homosexual male societies remained strongly negative in the eyes of most SF authors. For example, when overpopulation drives the world away from heterosexuality in Charles Beaumont's short story "The Crooked Man" (1955), first published in Playboy, inhumane homosexuals begin to oppress the heterosexual minority. In Anthony Burgess's The Wanting Seed (1962) homosexuality is required for official employment; Burgess treats this as one aspect of an unnatural state of affairs which includes violent warfare and the failing of the natural world.

Although not usually identified as a genre writer, William S. Burroughs produced works with a surreal narrative that estranged the action from the ordinary world as science fiction and fantasy do. In 1959 he published Naked Lunch, the first of many works such as The Nova Trilogy and The Wild Boys in which he linked drug use and homosexuality as anti-authoritarian activities.

New Wave era (1960–70s)

By the late 1960s, science fiction and fantasy began to reflect the changes prompted by the civil rights movement and the emergence of a counterculture.  Within the genres, these changes were incorporated into a movement called "the New Wave," a movement more sceptical of technology, more liberated socially, and more interested in stylistic experimentation. New Wave writers were more likely to claim an interest in "inner space" instead of outer space. They were less shy about explicit sexuality and more sympathetic to reconsiderations of gender roles and the social status of sexual minorities. Under the influence of New Wave editors and authors such as Michael Moorcock (editor of the influential New Worlds), sympathetic depictions of alternative sexuality and gender multiplied in science fiction and fantasy, becoming commonplace. The introduction of gay imagery has also been attributed to the influence of lesbian-feminist and gay liberation movements in the 1960s. In the 1970s, lesbians and gay men became a more visible presence in the SF community and as writers; notable gay authors included Joanna Russ, Thomas M. Disch and Samuel R. Delany.

Feminist SF authors imagined cultures in which homo- and bisexuality and a variety of gender models were the norm. Joanna Russ's The Female Man (1975) and the award-winning story "When It Changed", showing a female-only lesbian society that flourished without men, were enormously influential. Russ is largely responsible for introducing radical lesbian feminism into science fiction; she has stated that being openly lesbian was bad for her career and sales. Similar themes are explored in James Tiptree Jr.'s award-winning "Houston, Houston, Do You Read?", which presents a female-only society after the extinction of men from disease. The society lacks stereotypically "male" problems such as war, but is stagnant. The women reproduce via cloning and consider men to be comical. Tiptree was a closeted bisexual woman writing secretly under a male pseudonym, and explored the sexual impulse as her main theme.

Other feminist utopias do not include lesbianism: Ursula K. Le Guin's The Left Hand of Darkness (1969) depicts trans-species sexuality, in which individuals are neither "male" nor "female" but can have both male and female sexual organs and reproductive abilities, making them in some senses bisexual. In The Language of the Night, a collection of Le Guin's criticism, she admits to having "quite unnecessarily locked the Gethenians into heterosexuality ... the omission [of the homosexual option] implies that sexuality is heterosexuality. I regret this very much." Le Guin often explores alternative sexuality in her works, and has subsequently written many stories that examine the possibilities SF allows for non-traditional homosexuality, such as the bisexual bonding between clones in "Nine Lives". Sexual themes and fluid genders also figure in the works of John Varley, who came to prominence in the 1970s. Many of his stories contain mentions of same-sex love and gay and lesbian characters. In his "Eight Worlds" suite of stories and novels, humanity has achieved the ability to change sex on a whim. Homophobia is shown to initially inhibit uptake of this technology, as in his story "Options", as it engenders drastic changes in relationships, with bisexuality eventually becoming the norm for society. His Gaea trilogy features lesbian protagonists, and almost all the characters are to some degree bisexual.

Samuel R. Delany was one of the first openly gay science fiction authors; in his earliest stories the gay sexual aspect appears as a "sensibility", rather than in overt sexual references. In some stories, such as Babel-17 (1966), same-sex love and same-sex intercourse are clearly implied but are given a kind of protective colouration because the protagonist is a woman who is involved in a three-person marriage with two men. The affection all three characters share for each other is in the forefront, and sexual activity between or among them is not directly described. In Dhalgren (1975), his most famous science fiction novel, Delany peoples his large canvas with characters of a wide variety of sexualities. Once again, sexual activity is not the focus of the novel although there are some of the first explicitly described scenes of gay sex in SF and Delany depicts characters with a wide variety of motivations and behaviours.

Delany's Nebula-winning short story "Aye, and Gomorrah" posits the development of neutered human astronauts and then depicts the people who become sexually oriented toward them. By imagining a new gender and resultant sexual orientation, the story allows readers to reflect on the real world while maintaining an estranging distance. Further award-winning stories featuring gay characters, such as "Time Considered as a Helix of Semi-Precious Stones", were to follow, all collected in Delany's short story retrospective Aye, and Gomorrah, and other stories. Delany faced censorship from book distribution companies for treatment of these topics. In later works, gay themes become increasingly central to Delany's works, attracting controversy, and some blur the line between science fiction and gay pornography.
Delany's SF series Return to Neveryon was the first novel from a major US publisher to deal with the impact of AIDS,

Some lesbian science fiction is targeted specifically to a lesbian audience, rather than science fiction fans, and published by small feminist or lesbian fiction presses such as Bella Books, Bold Strokes Books, Ylva Publishing, Regal Crest Enterprises, Bedazzled Ink, Intaglio Publications, and Spinsters Ink. A notable author writing science fiction published by lesbian presses is Katherine V. Forrest.

LGBT speculative fiction awards
A number of awards exist that recognise works at the intersection of LGBT and speculative fiction:
 The Gaylactic Spectrum Awards honour works in science fiction, fantasy and horror which include positive explorations of gay, lesbian, bisexual or transgender characters, themes, or issues. The awards were instituted in 1999 and are given for best novel, short fiction and other works of the previous year. Works produced before the awards' inception are eligible for entry into the Hall of Fame.
 The Lambda Literary Awards include awards for science fiction, fantasy and horror. The awards were first presented in 1989, with separate categories for speculative fiction for lesbians and gay men. In 1993 these categories were merged and the combined award has undergone several name changes since then. Although the awards are given based on the quality of the writing and the LGBT themes, the author's sexual orientation is also a factor.
 The James Tiptree, Jr. Award honours works of science fiction or fantasy that expand or explore one's understanding of gender. Thus, it often goes to works which deal directly or tangentially with gay, lesbian, bisexual or transgender issues.
 Golden Crown Literary Society Awards (or "Goldies") are given to works containing lesbian themes or depictions of lesbian characters. Awards are given in numerous categories, including speculative fiction (or "SciFi/Fantasy/Horror") and paranormal romance.

See also

 Sex and sexuality in speculative fiction
 Gender in speculative fiction
 LGBT literature
 List of LGBT-themed speculative fiction
 List of LGBT figures in mythology
 Single-gender worlds

Footnotes
 SF is used throughout as an abbreviation for speculative fiction, for convenience. Science fiction and slash fiction are written in full when referred to specifically.
 Collected in In a Glass Darkly.
 Collected in A Saucer of Loneliness.
 Collected in Her Smoke Rose Up Forever.
 Collected in The Wind's Twelve Quarters.

References
Citations

Bibliography

 
 Clute, John & Peter Nicholls. The Encyclopedia of Science Fiction. London: Orbit, 1993 (2nd edition, 1999). .
 Clute, John & John Grant. The Encyclopedia of Fantasy. London: Orbit, 1997. .
 Dynes, Wayne R. with Warren Johansson, William A. Percy and Stephen Donaldson. Encyclopedia of Homosexuality. Garland Publishing Inc, 1990. . pg. 752.
 Garber, Eric & Lyn Paleo. Uranian Worlds: A Guide to Alternative Sexuality in Science Fiction, Fantasy, and Horror. G K Hall, 1983. .
 
 Pearson, Wendy Gay with Veronica Hollinger and Joan Gordon, (eds). Queer Universes: Sexualities in Science Fiction. Liverpool University Press, 2008. .

External links
 The Outer Alliance, LGBT advocacy in speculative fiction and literature
 GLBT Science Fiction and Fantasy Literature — A Web Directory
 Queer Science Fiction issue of speculative magazine The Future Fire
 The Gaylactic Network, LGBT fandom organization

 
Science fiction culture
LGBT themes in fiction